The Simpson Copple House is a historic residence in Hood River, Oregon, United States. Built in 1906 on a rise overlooking the Columbia River, it is one of the best preserved examples of the vernacular, late Queen Anne architectural style in Hood River. Its size, state of preservation, and fine detail work on its gables especially stand out from similar houses in the area. Simpson Copple (1842–1933) was a Civil War veteran and pioneer orchardist who was important in the growth of the apple industry in the Hood River Valley. He purchased the house shortly after its construction and lived there until his death.

The house was listed on the National Register of Historic Places in 1987.

See also

National Register of Historic Places listings in Hood River County, Oregon

References

External links

1906 establishments in Oregon
Buildings and structures in Hood River, Oregon
Houses completed in 1906
Houses in Hood River County, Oregon
Houses on the National Register of Historic Places in Oregon
National Register of Historic Places in Hood River County, Oregon
Queen Anne architecture in Oregon